Majed Kanabah (born 27 February 1993) is a Saudi Arabian professional footballer who plays as a central midfielder for Pro League side Al-Shabab.

Club career
Kanabah was the captain of Al-Ittihad's U23 team. On 4 February 2016, Kanabah joined city rivals Al-Ahli on a free transfer. He was released during the summer of 2016 and spent a year without a club. He joined Al-Batin on a one-year contract during the summer of 2017. He renewed his contract on 29 May 2018. On 30 May 2019, Kanabah joined Al-Fateh on a free transfer. On 19 April 2021, Kanabah renewed his contract with Al-Fateh. On 26 January 2023, Kanabah joined Al-Shabab.

Career statistics

Club

References

External links 
 

1993 births
Living people
Sportspeople from Jeddah
Saudi Arabian footballers
Saudi Arabia youth international footballers
Ittihad FC players
Al-Ahli Saudi FC players
Al Batin FC players
Al-Fateh SC players
Al-Shabab FC (Riyadh) players
Saudi Professional League players
Association football midfielders
Footballers at the 2014 Asian Games
Asian Games competitors for Saudi Arabia
21st-century Saudi Arabian people